The Genaro P. and Carolina Briones House is a historic home in downtown Austin, Texas, United States. Built by Genaro Briones over a period of 14 years, the home features unusual molded concrete construction and a dramatic two-story porch. It is known by some in the Hispanic community as "Casa de Sueños" (House of Dreams).

The home is located at 1204 E 7th Street, in a strongly Hispanic portion of east Austin. It was added to the National Register of Historic Places on August 7, 1998.

References

External links

Genero P. and Carolina Briones House National Park Service

Hispanic and Latino American culture in Austin, Texas
Houses in Austin, Texas
Houses on the National Register of Historic Places in Texas
National Register of Historic Places in Austin, Texas
City of Austin Historic Landmarks